Bradley Smith (born 21 February 1991) is a former British Racing Drivers' Club (BRDC) Rising Star and sports car driver from Essex, United Kingdom.
 
He is the Sunoco Prize winner and raced in the Rolex 24 at Daytona in 2014.

Career 
Starting in Karts at the young age of 8, Bradley began to win races at Club, National and European Level. Moving to Sports Cars in 2011, Bradley experienced half a season and was able to outdrive his 2004 car to gain top ten places.

In 2012, was his first full year competing in a Radical SR3 RS 260hp car in the Clubman Cup. Winning the Clubman cup championship in his first year

Moving to the endurance Radical SR3 challenge for 2013, he took his second championship. In 2014, he made his European debut in a V8 with a 2nd at Nürburgring and his maiden European win at Brands Hatch. A highly successful batch of races saw Bradley becoming European Champion in 2014 at his first attempt.

2015 Bradley became a Grade A ARDS instructor

Races 
2014 24 Hours of Daytona

2015 Ginetta G55 Supercup race winner

2014 Radical European Masters Champion

2013  Radical SR3 Challenge Champion

2012  Radical SR3 Clubman Cup Champion

References

External links
 
 
 Msvracing.co.uk

1991 births
Living people
People from Billericay
Sportspeople from Essex
English racing drivers
WeatherTech SportsCar Championship drivers
Team West-Tec drivers